Johan Algot Haquinius (July 13, 1886 – February 6, 1966) was a Swedish pianist and composer of classical music.

Haquinius was born in Sveg, and studied classical piano at the Royal Music Conservatory in Stockholm from 1898 until 1906. Later, he studied for Moritz Moszkowski and Ignaz Friedman in Berlin. Among his works are string quartets, a piano concerto, solo piano music, romances and orchestral suites. His music is often described as impressionistic.

Haquinius died in Stockholm.

References

External links
 Classical-composers.org

1886 births
1966 deaths
Swedish classical composers
Swedish male classical composers
Swedish classical pianists
Male classical pianists
String quartet composers
20th-century classical pianists
20th-century Swedish male musicians
20th-century Swedish musicians